Jérémy Messiba (born January 1, 1988 in Pointe-à-Pitre) is a retired French footballer.

Career
Messiba began his career 2003 in the youth side for AJ Auxerre and was 2007 promoted to the reserve team.

International career
He is former France national under-18 football team member and earned in two years eighteen caps.

References

External links
 

1988 births
Living people
French footballers
Association football defenders
AJ Auxerre players
Guadeloupean footballers
Ligue 1 players
Association football forwards
SC Selongey players